Saila Kinni (born 2 July 1987) is a Finnish orienteering competitor.

She won three bronze medals at the Junior World Orienteering Championships, during the 2005, 2006 and 2007 championships. She competed at the 2012 World Orienteering Championships. In the middle distance she qualified for the final, where she placed 10th.

References

External links
 

1987 births
Living people
Finnish orienteers
Female orienteers
Foot orienteers
Junior World Orienteering Championships medalists